Carcinarctia rufa is a moth of the family Erebidae. It was described by James John Joicey and George Talbot in 1921. It is found in the Democratic Republic of the Congo, Rwanda and Uganda.

References

Spilosomina
Moths described in 1921
Insects of the Democratic Republic of the Congo
Insects of Uganda
Moths of Africa